NA-165 Bahawalpur-II is a constituency for the National Assembly of Pakistan.

Members of Parliament

2018-2022: NA-172 Bahawalpur-III

Election 2002 

General elections were held on 10 Oct 2002. Aitzaz Ahsan of PPP won by 73,660 votes.

Election 2008 

General elections were held on 18 Feb 2008. Chaudhry Saud Majeed of PML-N won by 77,860 votes.

Election 2013 

General elections were held on 11 May 2013. Ch.Tariq Bashir Cheema of PML-Q won by 92,972 votes and became the  member of National Assembly.

Election 2018 

General elections were held on 25 July 2018.

See also
NA-164 Bahawalpur-I
NA-166 Bahawalpur-III

References

External links 
Election result's official website

NA-187